also well known as Numa Castle is the remains of a castle structure in Higashi-ku, Okayama Prefecture, Japan. Its ruins have been protected as a Okayama City Designated Historic Site.

The castle was bulit by Nakayama Nobutada in the Tenbun period. In 1559, Ukita Naoie killed Nakayama Nobumasa by order of Uragami Munekage. Then Naoie moved Ukita clan's main bastion from Shinjōyama castle. Naoie expanded his territory based in the castle. In 1570, Naoie started remodeling Okayama castle and moved from the castle in 1573.

Soon after the Honnō-ji Incident, Hashiba Hideyoshi stopped and stayed in the castle on his way back to Kyoto to fight Akechi Mitsuhide's army.

References

Castles in Okayama Prefecture
Historic Sites of Japan
Former castles in Japan
Ruined castles in Japan
Ukita clan